Jupiter's Legacy is an American superhero television series that premiered on Netflix on May 7, 2021, based on the comic book series of the same name by Mark Millar and Frank Quitely, and published by Image Comics. Produced by Millarworld, Di Bonaventura Pictures, and DeKnight Productions, the show was developed for television by Steven S. DeKnight who initially served as showrunner, but was replaced by Sang Kyu Kim midway through production. It stars Josh Duhamel, Ben Daniels, Leslie Bibb, Andrew Horton, Elena Kampouris, Mike Wade and Matt Lanter. The series received mixed reviews, and was canceled after one season, with a spin-off continuation, a live-action adaptation of Supercrooks, ordered to series. Super Crooks, an anime adaptation of Supercrooks set in the same fictional universe as Jupiter's Legacy, preceding the additional live-action series, was released to Netflix in November 2021.

Synopsis
Shortly after his father's suicide in 1929, triggered by Black Thursday, former businessman Sheldon Sampson travels to an uncharted island in the Atlantic Ocean, where he, his brother, Walter and four others received superpowers. He then creates a superhero team called the Union of Justice and his guiding ideals - never kill anyone, never interfere in political matters - remain unchanged over the near-century of his adventures as the Utopian.

However, the next generation of superheroes, including his children, struggles to live up to his rigid ideals and high expectations. When Sheldon's son, Brandon seemingly kills one of their greatest foes, it ignites a public debate over whether those ideals are still relevant.

Cast and characters

Main
 Josh Duhamel as Sheldon Sampson / The Utopian, Grace's husband, Walter's younger brother, and the leader of the Union of Justice superhero team. He is the Superman archetype, with a similar powerset and morality.
 Ben Daniels as Walter Sampson / Brainwave, Sheldon's older brother, possessing psionic abilities, along with flight and super strength.
 Leslie Bibb as Grace Kennedy-Sampson / Lady Liberty, Sheldon's wife and one of the most powerful heroes on the planet. Acting as Sheldon's confidant, advising him with regards to modern change and parenting, she always voices her opinions even if they conflict with his.
 Andrew Horton as Brandon Sampson / Paragon, Grace and Sheldon's son, who struggles to meet his father's expectations.
 Elena Kampouris as Chloe Sampson, Grace and Sheldon's rebellious daughter, who is absorbed in a life of drugs and modeling, becomes cold and ruthless such as dismissing the deaths of her friends, and attacking them when they begin questioning if she cared for them.
 Mike Wade as Fitz Small / The Flare, one of the Union's most valued members, who has flight and can manipulate energy, now a retired paraplegic. A skilled engineer and inventor, he developed most of the tech that has aided the Union.
 Matt Lanter as George Hutchence / Skyfox, Sheldon's closest friend and teammate before turning against the Union after breaking the Code. Since leaving the Union, he has not been seen.

Recurring
 Gracie Dzienny as Ruby Red, a superheroine who can create psionic armor around herself. She is also Brandon's ex-girlfriend.
 Tyler Mane as Blackstar, an extremely powerful supervillain seeking vengeance against the Sampsons, whose antimatter heart powers his exo-suit. Mane also portrays the Blackstar clone.
 Meg Steedle as Jane, Sheldon's ex-fiancé who leaves as he starts the voyage that led to him becoming a superhero.
 Richard Blackburn as Chester Sampson, Sheldon's and Walter's steel-magnate father who committed suicide on Black Thursday after leveraging pensions with credit.
 Tenika Davis as Petra Small / The Flare II, Fitz's daughter and a superheroine who shares her father's powers. Despite coming to question the Code after fighting Blackstar's clone, she remains steadfast with her friends.
 Tyrone Benskin as Willie Small, Fitz's father and a worker at Chester's factory. He convinced Fitz to accept Sheldon's quest.
 Aiza Ntibarikure as Sierra / Ectoplex, a superhero who had plasma-based abilities, survivor's guilt, and resents Chloe for breaking off from the team.
 David Julian Hirsh as Richard Conrad / Blue Bolt, a member of the original Union who first used the power rod. He was a Red Cross doctor found adrift, rescued by Sheldon's party before helping the group gain their powers through the trials.
 Ian Quinlan as Hutch, George's son who uses Blue Bolt's teleportation rod to commit crimes with his crew, attaining materials to make a portal to find his father.
 Conrad Coates as Captain Borges, the captain of the ship Sheldon uses to travel the Atlantic.

Guest
 Sharon Belle as Iron Orchid, a supervillainess who uses a powered suit to rob banks.
 Stephen Oyoung as Barry / Tectonic, a superhero with vibration and geo-kinetic powers, as well as Brandon's best friend.
 Gregg Lowe as Briggs / Flaming Fist, a superhero with pyrokinetic abilities and one of Brandon's long-time friends.
 Kathryn Davis as Vera / Phase Out, a superhero with the ability to become invisible.
 Humberly Gonzalez as Gabriella / Neutrino, a member of Hutch's crew who possesses electrokinetic abilities and Jacinda's lover.
 Jess Salgueiro as Jacinda / Shockwave, Gabriella's girlfriend who can emit shockwaves from her hands.
 Morgan David Jones as Jack Frost, a cryokinetic member of Hutch's crew who owns a magic van that once belonged to a magical supervillain.
 Kara Royster as Janna Croft / Ghost Beam, a friendly superhero who is old friends with Chloe.
 Robert Maillet as Big Man, a super-powered crime lord whom Hutch used to work for before killing him.
 Kurtwood Smith as Old Man Miller, a man with similar hallucinations as Sheldon's whom he encounters in Kansas after a long search.
 Franco Lo Presti as Nick of Time, a man with time-warping abilities who seduces Chloe in hopes of getting into the Union.
 Jake Lewis as Jay / Volcaner, a hero who can create and manipulate lava, who loses faith in the Code.
 Paul Amos as Dr. Barnabas Wolfe, a man with flight and inorganic matter-warping abilities which is an old acquaintance of the Union.
 Nigel Bennett as Dr. Jack Hobbs, one of the Utopian's old enemies, now serving as his imprisoned therapist.
 Chase Tang and Micah Karns as Baryon, a supervillain previously affiliated with Blackstar, who can create energy blasts.
 Anna Akana as Raikou, Walter's daughter, a vigilante/assassin possessing super strength and telepathy, who also uses ningato.

Episodes

Production

Development
On July 17, 2018, it was announced that Netflix had given the production a series order for an eight-episode first season. The series was developed by Steven S. DeKnight, who is credited as an executive producer alongside Lorenzo di Bonaventura and Dan McDermott. On September 16, 2019, it was confirmed that DeKnight departed the series as showrunner over creative differences in the midst of the production for the first season. In November 2019, it was announced that Sang Kyu Kim was taking over as showrunner, following DeKnight's exit from the series. On June 2, 2021, it was reported that series will not be an ongoing series as the cast has been released. Mark Millar, who is credited as an executive producer, also stated that he's confident they will "return to it later". Budget conflicts and replacing Knight as showrunner with Kim halfway through production were some factors in the series' decision to forgo a second season.

Casting
In February 2019, it was announced that Josh Duhamel, Ben Daniels, Leslie Bibb, Elena Kampouris, Andrew Horton, Mike Wade and Matt Lanter would star in the series. In April 2019, it was reported that Tenika Davis had been cast in a recurring role. In August 2019, it was reported that Chase Tang had been cast as a supervillain. In September 2020, Anna Akana was cast in a recurring role.

Filming
Principal photography for the first season was scheduled to initially commence in May 2019. Filming for the first season commenced in Toronto on July 2, 2019 and ended on January 24, 2020. Additional reshoots occurred in January 2021.

Release
On February 24, 2021, a teaser trailer for the series was released. On April 7, 2021, Netflix released the official trailer for the series. The official trailer for the series features "Play God" by British artist Sam Fender. The series premiered on May 7, 2021.

Reception

Critical response

Review aggregator Rotten Tomatoes assessed 52 reviews and determined 38% of them to be positive, with an average rating of 5.3/10. The website's critics consensus reads, "Despite some truly epic fights, Jupiter's Legacy is simply too overstuffed and slow-moving to land many narrative punches." According to review aggregator Metacritic, the series received "mixed or average reviews", based on a weighted average score of 45 out of 100 from 15 critic reviews.

David Griffin of IGN described Jupiter's Legacy as good, rating it a 7 out of 10, and writing that it "delivers plenty of exciting superhero action, compelling stories, and memorable characters."

Viewership

Jupiter's Legacy was the most-watched show on any streaming service during the week of May 3–9, 2021, garnering 696 million minutes of viewing for the whole season per Nielsen Corporation. The runner-up was The Handmaid's Tale with 690 million minutes of viewing. The show however ranked below the premiere of Netflix's last major series Shadow and Bone, which garnered 721 million minutes of viewership during the weekend it was released.

Jupiter's Legacy also topped the week of May 10–16, 2021, with 1.019 billion minutes viewed. It was followed by StartUp, which garnered 760 million minutes of viewing. The series suffered a decline of 60% for the week of May 17–23, with 405 million minutes being viewed. It was the third most-streamed original series and occupied the tenth spot overall in streaming rankings, including both films and TV shows.

In the week from May 24–30, the series ranked seventh overall in streaming rankings for shows with 214 million minutes viewed.

Super Crooks spin-offs

Anime

In March 2019, Netflix announced that a Supercrooks anime adaptation was in production with Studio Bones in March 2019, and the series was ready for its world premiere at the Annecy International Animation Film Festival in June 2021. At its premiere, director Motonobu Hori revealed that the series would be set in the same fictional universe as the live-action series Jupiter's Legacy.

Live-action series
In June 2021, simultaneously with the series' cancellation, a spin-off continuation of Jupiter's Legacy, a live-action Super Crooks adaptation separate from the anime series of the same name, was ordered to series for a 2021–2022 release.

References

External links
 
 

2021 American television series debuts
2021 American television series endings
2020s American drama television series
American superhero television series
English-language Netflix original programming
Television series about families
Television series based on Image Comics
Television shows filmed in Toronto